The Parachute Paradox is a memoir by the artist Steve Sabella, published in September 2016 by Kerber Verlag. It details Sabella's upbringing in Jerusalem under Israeli occupation, his subsequent nomadism, and the development of his art practice as a means of mental emancipation from the colonisation of the imagination.

The London-based newspaper Al-Araby Al-Jadeed stated, "The Parachute Paradox…proposes a subject that is unprecedented in Palestinian literature: the liberation of the self and the homeland through the liberation of the imagination."

Emerging themes

The Israeli occupation of Palestine

Throughout the memoir, Sabella writes on the psychic and physical effects of living in an occupied Palestine. The book’s title metaphors the Israeli occupation, referring to a tandem skydive jump Sabella took in Haifa.

Colonization of the imagination

Sabella identifies the Israeli occupation as affecting both the bodily and mental lives of Palestinians. With Israel’s constant military presence, the establishment of checkpoints and barriers, and the construction of settlements, he finds that Palestinian reality has become fragmented and entrapped in a seemingly eternal condition:

Exile and global citizenship

Leaving Jerusalem for London in 2007 and then Berlin in 2010, Sabella writes about life in exile—a state experienced both at home, as a Palestinian living under occupation, and abroad:

Identity

Sabella explains that his identity is based on his understanding of the world, rather than his religion, ethnicity, or nationality. He says of identity:

Liberation

Sabella argues for the necessity of a personal, mental liberation from systemic oppression instead of one that is solely based on political and social change.

Awards 

The Parachute Paradox won the 2016 Nautilus Book Awards for best memoir. The book was also a finalist for The International Book Awards.

Reception and media coverage

General commentary

Referring to The Parachute Paradox as "this captivating black book," the philosopher, curator, and writer Almut Shulamit Bruckstein Çoruh stated: "The artist teaches us ways of escape from the deadlocks of visual codes inspired by the power of the imagination…The Parachute Paradox is therefore also a book about the transformation of the self, about freedom, about liberating the image of Jerusalem from her ideological confinement, about the power of love, and about the artistic imagination breaking free."

In the newspaper Al Khaleej, the novelist, poet, and critic Mohammed Al-Assad wrote of The Parachute Paradox:

The Palestinian activist Hanan Debwania wrote:

Features and excerpts

The art journal Protocollum published the eighth chapter of The Parachute Paradox while Sabella was writing the book. The same month it was published, Al-Araby Al-Jadeed published the book's prologue, translated by Mohammed Al-Assad. Following its publication, the memoir gained attention and esteem, reviewed in numerous international publications. NPR Berlin ran a two-episode feature on the memoir in their Life in Berlin program. For their issue titled "Future Visions for Jerusalem," the Palestine-Israel Journal also published an excerpt.

Reviews and interviews

Book launches

Contemporary Art Platform, Kuwait City, Kuwait. October 5, 2016.
Reading and conversation with Sabella and the writer, poet and critic Mohammed al-Assad.

Institute of Critical Inquiry (ICI), Berlin, Germany. October 18, 2016.
Reading and discussion with Sabella, director of ifa-Galerie Alya Sebti, and founder of Taswir Projects Dr. Almút Sh. Bruckstein.

Alserkal Avenue, Dubai, UAE. November 13, 2016.
Reading and conversation with Sabella and Editor-in-chief of Harper’s Bazaar Art Arabia Rebecca Anne Proctor; in collaboration with Barjeel Art Foundation

School of Oriental and African Studies, University of London, London, UK. November 21, 2016.
Reading and conversation with Dr. Siba Aldabbagh and Professor Wen-Chin Ouyang.

Design

The first edition of The Parachute Paradox was printed in a limited edition of 1,250 copies, in addition to 150 artist proofs, and 100 for media. The pages are bound in a Swiss brochure style, with a folding, double hard cover and an exposed spine.

The book's material concept was conceived by Sabella, and its design was carried out by Verlena Gerlach.

Image gallery

See also
Palestinian art
Palestinian literature
Akademie der Künste
Kamal Boullata
List of University of Westminster alumni
Mathaf: Arab Museum of Modern Art

References

External links
Kerber Verlag The Parachute Paradox
Steve Sabella official website

2016 non-fiction books
Nautilus Book Award winners
Memoirs